Ares Cliff is a cliff in Antarctica. It was mapped from trimetrogon air photography taken by the Ronne Antarctic Research Expedition, 1947–48, and from survey by the Falkland Islands Dependencies Survey, 1948–50, and named by the UK Antarctic Place-Names Committee in association with Mars Glacier after the Greek god of war, Ares.

See also

Georgian Cliff
Hall Cliff

References 

Cliffs of Alexander Island